A partial solar eclipse will occur on July 15, 2083. A solar eclipse occurs when the Moon passes between Earth and the Sun, thereby totally or partly obscuring the image of the Sun for a viewer on Earth. A partial solar eclipse occurs in the polar regions of the Earth when the center of the Moon's shadow misses the Earth. This will be the 72nd and final event from Solar Saros 118.

Related eclipses

Solar eclipses 2083–2087

Saros 118 

It is a part of Saros cycle 118, repeating every 18 years, 11 days, containing 72 events. The series started with partial solar eclipse on May 24, 803 AD. It contains total eclipses from August 19, 947 AD through October 25, 1650, hybrid eclipses on November 4, 1668 and November 15, 1686, and annular eclipses from November 27, 1704 through April 30, 1957. The series ends at member 72 as a partial eclipse on July 15, 2083. The longest duration of total was 6 minutes, 59 seconds on May 16, 1398.

References

External links 

2083 7 15
2083 7 15
2083 in science
Partial solar eclipses